Discoplax rotunda is a species of land crab in the genus Discoplax found in the Pacific Ocean.

References

Grapsoidea
Terrestrial crustaceans
Crustaceans described in 1824